Stateliner is South Australia's largest long-distance coach operator, running services from Adelaide across the state.

History
In 1966, Alan Crawford established Premier Roadlines. In 1980, Stateliner was purchased, with the business rebranded Premier Stateliner, before being rebranded Stateliner in 2019.

Services
Stateliner operates services from and to Adelaide:
Ceduna via Port Augusta
Mount Gambier
Port Lincoln via Port Augusta
Renmark & Loxton
Whyalla via Port Augusta

Fleet
As at January 2019, the fleet consisted of 33 coaches.

References

External links
Showbus gallery

Bus companies of South Australia
Transport companies established in 1966
Australian companies established in 1966